The F# Software Foundation (FSSF) is a non-profit organization devoted to the F# programming language. It was founded at the beginning of 2013 and became a 501(c)(3) non-profit organization in December 2014. The mission of the foundation is to foster development of the F# community and is responsible for various processes within the F# community, including assisting development of the core F# distribution and libraries, managing intellectual rights, and raising funds.

The current Board of Trustees and Officers of the FSSF are listed below:

Officers
 Chairperson of the Board of Trustees: Ryan Coy 
 Secretary of the Board of Trustees: Houston Haynes
 Secretary: Mathias Brandewinder
 Treasurer: Paulmichael Blasucci
 Executive Director: Reed Copsey, Jr. 
 Technical Advisor: Don Syme

Board of Trustees
 Kevin Avignon
 Phillip Carter
 Ryan Coy
 Houston Haynes
 Janne Siera

The Executive Director and Technical Advisor roles serve as Ex-Officio, non-voting members of the Board of Trustees

References

External links
 F# Software Foundation
 F# Core Engineering Group

Charities based in Nevada
Free software project foundations in the United States